The 1989–90 Albanian National Championship was the 51st season of the Albanian National Championship, the top professional league for association football clubs, since its establishment in 1930.

League table

Note: '17 Nëntori' is Tirana, 'Lokomotiva Durrës' is Teuta, 'Labinoti' is Elbasani

Results

First and second round

Third round

Season statistics

Top scorers

References

Albania - List of final tables (RSSSF)

Kategoria Superiore seasons
1
Albanian Superliga